Mobile Vehicle Engineering Institute is a company based in Saint Petersburg, Russia. It is currently part of Uralvagonzavod.

It designed and built prototypes of tanks, including the T-80, for the Kirov Plant Production Association. It was involved in the conversion of tank technology for civilian applications. It was also the production facility for the Russian Mars rover, which was developed in concert with the Babakin Center and the Russian Space Research Institute.

References

External links
 Official website

Vehicle manufacturing companies of Russia
Companies based in Saint Petersburg
Uralvagonzavod
Ministry of the Defense Industry (Soviet Union)
Defence companies of the Soviet Union
Research institutes in the Soviet Union